The Men's 50 km race walk at the 2005 World Championships in Athletics was held on August 12 in the streets of Helsinki with the goal line situated in the Helsinki Olympic Stadium.

Medalists

Abbreviations
All times shown are in hours:minutes:seconds

Startlist

Intermediates

Finishing times
  Sergey Kirdyapkin, Russia 3:38:08 (PB)
  Aleksey Voyevodin, Russia 3:41:25
  Alex Schwazer, Italy 3:41:54 (NR)
  Trond Nymark, Norway 3:44:04 (NR)
  Zhao Chengliang, China 3:44:45
  Omar Zepeda, Mexico 3:49:01
  Roman Magdziarczyk, Poland 3:49:55 (SB)
  Yuki Yamazaki, Japan 3:51:15
  Horacio Nava, Mexico 3:53:57
  Peter Korčok, Slovakia 3:55:02
  Tim Berrett, Canada 3:55:48
  Julio Rene Martinez, Guatemala 3:57:56
  Marco De Luca, Italy 3:58:32
  Denis Langlois, France 3:59:31
  Ken Akashi, Japan 3:59:35
  Kim Dong-Young, South Korea 4:01:25 (SB)
  Modris Liepinš, Latvia 4:01:54 (SB)
  Miloš Bátovský, Slovakia 4:05:44
  Sergey Korepanov, Kazakhstan 4:06:23 (SB)
  Pedro Martins, Portugal 4:08:12
  Antti Kempas, Finland 4:10:30
  Jorge Costa, Portugal 4:22:17
  Philip Dunn, United States 4:25:27

Athletes who did not finish 
 Han Yucheng, China
 Xing Shucai, China
  Oleksiy Kazanin, Ukraine
  Rafal Fedaczynski, Poland
  Andrey Stepanchuk, Belarus
  Sérgio Galdino, Brazil
  Luis Fernando García, Guatemala

Athletes disqualified 
  Fredrik Svensson, Sweden
  Craig Barrett, New Zealand
  Jesús Angel García, Spain
  Jani Lehtinen, Finland
  Aleksandar Raković, Serbia and Montenegro
  Viktor Ginko, Belarus
  Miloš Holuša, Czech Republic
  Aigars Fadejevs, Latvia
  Mikel Odriozola, Spain
  Grzegorz Sudol, Poland
  Vladimir Kanaykin, Russia
  Diego Cafagna, Italy
  Miguel Solis, Mexico
  Yohan Diniz, France

See also
 2005 Race Walking Year Ranking

External links
IAAF results

50 km walk
Racewalking at the World Athletics Championships